The 16319/16320 Kochuveli - SMVT Bengaluru  Humsafar Express is an express train of the Indian Railways connecting  in Kerala and SMVT in Karnataka. It is currently being operated with 16319/16320 train numbers on bi-weekly basis.

Coach composition 

The train was designed by Indian Railways. It runs with a composition of 16 AC 3-tier and 2 Second class sleeper coaches.The train has standard LHB Modern High Speed rake with unique Humsafar Livery
It includes a LED screen which shows passengers information about other stations and other information. An announcement system for the train is expected to be implemented in the future.

Service

It averages 50 km/hr as 16319/Kochuveli - SMVT  Humsafar Express starts on Thursday and Saturday from  covering 828 km in 16 h 40 m & 59 km/hr as 16320/SMVT - Kochuveli Humsafar Express starts on Sunday and Friday from  covering 826 km in 14 h 05 m.

Timing

Coach position

Coach position for 16319 Kochuveli-SMVT Bengaluru Humsafar Express 

Coach position for 16320 SMVT Bengaluru-Kochuveli Humsafar Express

Traction

Both trains are hauled by a Royapuram / Erode  based WAP 7 (HOG) equipped locomotive on its entire journey.

Route & Halts

See also

 Kochuveli railway station
 Kochuveli Yesvantpur Garib Rath Express
 Mysuru Junction–Kochuveli Express
Yesvantpur–Kochuveli AC Express

References

External links 

 16319/Kochuveli - Banaswadi Humsafar Express
 16320/Banaswadi - Kochuveli Humsafar Express

Humsafar Express trains
Transport in Bangalore
Transport in Thiruvananthapuram
Rail transport in Kerala
Rail transport in Tamil Nadu
Rail transport in Karnataka
Railway services introduced in 2018